Crain Ridge is a ridge along the north flank of Strange Glacier in the Latady Mountains, Palmer Land. It was mapped by the U.S. Geological Survey from ground surveys and from U.S. Navy air photos, 1961–67. It was named by the Advisory Committee on Antarctic Names for Harold D.K. Crain, a utilitiesman with the South Pole Station winter party in 1967.

References
 

Ridges of Palmer Land